Gelechia clandestina is a moth of the family Gelechiidae. It is found in Russia (Primorsky Krai, Sakhalin Island).

References

Moths described in 1986
Gelechia